Within the Eye of Chaos is the third full-length studio album by the Australian melodic death metal band Daysend, released on Feb 19, 2010 by Stomp Entertainment.

Track listing
 "See You in My Nightmares" - 4:30
 "Mindless" - 2:51
 "The Coldest of Disasters" - 4:21
 "Questions" - 3:53
 "Simple Minds" - 4:31
 "Without Tears" - 2:06
 "In This Moment" - 5:10
 "Acid Laced Fiasco" - 4:07
 "Down This Hole" - 4:15
 "Edge of the Line" - 4:30
 "Recoil" - 2:15

Personnel

 Mark Halcroft (McKernan) − vocals
 Aaron Bilbija − guitar
 Meredith Webster − bass
 Wayne Morris − drums

References

2010 albums
Daysend albums